The 2020–21 Stumptown AC season was the club's second in the National Independent Soccer Association (NISA), second overall, and first under this name and management.

Roster

Players

Staff
  Rod Underwood – Head coach
  Erik Imler – Assistant coach

Competitions

2020 Fall season 

Initial details for the NISA Fall 2020 season were released on June 4, 2020. Prior to the season, the league announced both Stumptown Athletic and San Diego 1904 FC would go on hiatus for the fall. In early March 2021, NISA announced Stumptown AC would play in the Spring season with new ownership. American soccer executive Fred Matthes and Carrie Taylor were named team president and head of operations, respectively.

2021 Spring Season

NISA Legends Cup 
NISA announced initial spring season plans in early February 2021, including starting the season with a tournament in Chattanooga, Tennessee with a standard regular season to follow. The tournament, now called the NISA Legends Cup, was officially announced on March 10 and is scheduled to run between April 13 and 25. All nine NISA members teams take part in the Spring will be divided into three team groups. The highest placing group winner would automatically qualify for the tournament final, while the second and third highest finishing teams overall would play one-another in a semifinal to determine a second finalist.

Stumptown were drawn into Group 2 alongside California United Strikers FC and the Fall champions Detroit City FC.

Standings

Group 2 results

Matches

Regular season 
The Spring Season schedule was announced on March 18 with each association member playing eight games, four home and four away, in a single round-robin format.

Standings

Matches

U.S. Open Cup 

As a team playing in a recognized professional league, Stumptown would normally be automatically qualified for the U.S. Open Cup. However, with the 2021 edition shorted due to the COVID-19 pandemic, NISA has only been allotted 1 to 2 teams spots. On March 29, U.S. Soccer announced 2020 Fall Champion Detroit City FC as NISA's representative in the tournament.

Squad statistics

Appearances and goals 

|-
! colspan="16" style="background:#dcdcdc; text-align:center"| Goalkeepers

|-
! colspan="16" style="background:#dcdcdc; text-align:center"| Defenders

|-
! colspan="16" style="background:#dcdcdc; text-align:center"| Midfielders

|-
! colspan="16" style="background:#dcdcdc; text-align:center"| Forwards

|-
! colspan="16" style="background:#dcdcdc; text-align:center"| Left during season
|-
|}

Goal scorers

Disciplinary record

References

External links 

 

Stumptown AC
Stumptown AC
Stumptown AC
Stumptown AC